Lyubomir Sheytanov (Bulgarian Cyrillic: Любомир Шейтанов) (born 17 July 1961 in Burgas) is a former Bulgarian footballer who played as a goalkeeper and currently the goalkeeping coach of Bulgaria.

References

1961 births
Living people
Bulgarian footballers
FC Chernomorets Burgas players
PFC Dobrudzha Dobrich players
First Professional Football League (Bulgaria) players
Second Professional Football League (Bulgaria) players
Sportspeople from Burgas
Association football goalkeepers